Tilata (Aymara tilaña to set in row, -ta a suffix, "set in row", also spelled Telata) is a  mountain in the Cordillera Real in the Bolivian Andes. It is located in the La Paz Department, Murillo Province, La Paz Municipality. Tilata is situated south of the mountain Llamp'u, north-west of Qala Uyu (Khala Huyo) and north-east of Wayna Potosí. Tilata Lake lies east of the mountain.

References 

Mountains of La Paz Department (Bolivia)